This is a list of electoral results for the electoral district of Mooloolah in Queensland state elections.

Members for Mooloolah

Election results

Elections in the 1990s

References

Queensland state electoral results by district